Salihu Yakubu-Danladi (born 31 May 1985) is a Nigerian engineer and politician who was elected speaker of the 9th Kwara State House of Assembly in 2019. 

Yakubu-Danladi is a first-time member of the state assembly, elected on the platform of the All Progressives Congress to represent Ilesha-Gwanara in Baruten state constituency. He was nominated by vSaheed Popoola (APC, Balogun-Ojomu Constituency) and was seconded by Haliru Danbaba (APC).

Early life and education 
Yakubu-Danladi was born in Gwanara, Baruten  of Kwara state. His early education began in 1988 at BLGEA Primary School where he earned First School Leaving Certificate 1993. Yakubu-Danladi attended St  Anthony Secondary School, Ilorin finishing with a Senior Secondary Certificate Examination in 2001. He attended Kaduna Polytechnic College where he received a National Diploma (ND) and Higher National Diploma (HND) in Electrical/Electronic Engineering between 2003 and 2008. 

In 2016, Yakubu-Danladi earned B.Eng in Electrical/Electronic Engineering  from Federal University of Technology, Minna.

References 

Kwara State politicians
1985 births
Living people